Igor Dmitriyevich Maslov (born 14 May 1995) is a Russian football player. He plays for FC Sakhalin Yuzhno-Sakhalinsk.

Club career
He made his debut in the Russian Professional Football League for FC Volga-Olimpiyets Nizhny Novgorod on 10 August 2015 in a game against FC Syzran-2003.

He made his Russian Football National League debut for FC Volga Nizhny Novgorod on 20 March 2016 in a game against FC KAMAZ Naberezhnye Chelny.

References

External links
 
 
 Profile by Russian Professional Football League

1995 births
Sportspeople from Nizhny Novgorod
Living people
Russian footballers
Association football defenders
FC Volga Nizhny Novgorod players
FC Nizhny Novgorod (2015) players
FC Smena Komsomolsk-na-Amure players
FC Sakhalin Yuzhno-Sakhalinsk players
FC Nosta Novotroitsk players